Sheena Kamal is a Canadian novelist. Her works include thrillers and young adult fiction.

Early life and education 
Kamal moved to Canada from Trinidad at age 6. She received a degree in political science from the University of Toronto and worked in the film industry before beginning a career as a novelist.

Writing

Nora Watts series 
, Kamal has published three novels that centre on Nora Watts: The Lost Ones (2017), It All Falls Down (2018), and No Going Back (2020). Watts, a crime investigator, is half-Indigenous and half-Palestinian and lives in Vancouver's Downtown Eastside.

The Lost Ones (2017) is a thriller set in Vancouver. Kamal developed the concept for the novel while working as a staffer on Shoot the Messenger.

Roxane Gay praised The Lost Ones on her Goodreads account and Jael Richardson selected it as a recommended title on CBC Radio's q books programme. The novel won 2018's Macavity Award for best first novel.

Fight Like a Girl 
Kamal's first book for young readers is Fight Like a Girl (2020). The novel centres on Trisha, a teenager who practises Muay Thai, whose father dies in a car accident. Novelist Jennifer Hillier recommended the work in Ms., noting that "I would buy this book based on the title alone".

Personal life 
Like the main character of Fight Like a Girl, Kamal practises Muay Thai.

Works

References

External links 
 

Living people
21st-century Canadian novelists
21st-century Canadian women writers
Canadian thriller writers
University of Toronto alumni
Macavity Award winners
Women thriller writers
Year of birth missing (living people)